Elisabeth Moore won the singles tennis title by defeating reigning champion Juliette Atkinson 6–4, 4–6, 6–2, 6–2 in the Challenge Round of the 1896 U.S. Women's National Singles Championship. Moore had won the right to challenge Atkinson by defeating Annabella Wistar 6–3, 7–5, 6–0 in the final of the All Comers' competition. The event was played on outdoor grass courts and held at the Philadelphia Cricket Club in Wissahickon Heights, Chestnut Hill, Philadelphia from June 17 through June 20, 1896.

Draw

Challenge round

All Comers' finals

References

1896
1896 in American women's sports
June 1896 sports events
Women's Singles
1896 in women's tennis
Women's sports in Pennsylvania
Chestnut Hill, Philadelphia
1896 in Pennsylvania